The following Confederate Army units and commanders fought in the Siege of Charleston Harbor of the American Civil War. The Union order of battle is listed separately.

The following lists contain the commanders and units involved in the operations against Charleston Harbor from July to September 1863.  The first phase from July 10–18 includes the initial engagements at First Fort Wagner, Grimball's Landing and Second Fort Wagner.  The second phase from July 19-September 8 includes siege operations against Charleston Harbor and Fort Sumter.

Abbreviations used

Military rank
 Gen = General
 LTG = Lieutenant General
 MG = Major General
 BG = Brigadier General
 Col = Colonel
 Ltc = Lieutenant Colonel
 Maj = Major
 Cpt = Captain
 Lt = Lieutenant
 Sgt = Sergeant

Other
 w = wounded
 mw = mortally wounded
 k =killed
 c = captured

Initial Engagements (July 10–18, 1863)

Department of South Carolina, Georgia and Florida
Gen Pierre G. T. Beauregard

First District
BG Roswell S. Ripley

Siege Operations (July 19-September 8, 1863)

Department of South Carolina, Georgia and Florida
Gen Pierre G. T. Beauregard

First District
BG Roswell S. Ripley

Morris Island Commanders (July 9-September 7)
The commanders of Morris Island, scene of the majority of fighting, proved to be ever fluctuating. The following is a list and dates of the officers who commanded Morris Island during the campaign.

See also

 South Carolina in the American Civil War

Notes

References
 Eicher, John H., & Eicher, David J., Civil War High Commands. Stanford University Press, 2001. .
 Wise, Stephen R., Gate of Hell: Campaign for Charleston Harbor, 1863. Columbia, South Carolina: University of South Carolina Press, 1994.

American Civil War orders of battle
African Americans in the American Civil War
African-American history of the United States military